Hala Fadel is an international investor and a partner at Leap Ventures, a venture capital firm based in Beirut and Dubai. She is also the founder and chair of the MIT Enterprise Forum of the pan-Arab region.

Fadel graduated from HEC Paris in 1997 with a Masters in Financial Economics. She received an M.B.A. from the MIT Sloan, also attended the Haas School of Business.

References 

1974 births
Lebanese business executives
Living people